Eran-asan-kerd-Kawad or Iran asan kar(t) Kavad ( ʾylʾnʾsʾnklkwʾt, meaning "Kavad [has] made Ērān peaceful") was a Sasanian city founded by Kavad I in the Hulwan region. It was the capital of a province possibly identical to the Hulwan region and bordering the provinces of Syarazur (Shahrizor) and Garamig. The geographer Josef Markwart placed the city between Adiabene and Garamig. It is mentioned in both Armenian sources and the Middle Persian Šahrestānīhā ī Ērānšahr ("Provincial Capitals of Ērān").

References

Sources
 
 
 
 

Sasanian cities
Kavad I